The 1993 Calgary Stampeders finished in 1st place in the West Division with a 15–3 record. They attempted to defend their Grey Cup championship in front of a home crowd at McMahon Stadium, but they lost in the West Final to the eventual Grey Cup champions Edmonton Eskimos.

Offseason

CFL Draft

Preseason

Regular season

Season standings

Season schedule

Awards and records
Jackie Parker Trophy – Brian Wiggins (WR)
Jeff Nicklin Memorial Trophy – Doug Flutie (QB)

1993 CFL All-Stars

Western All-Star selections

Playoffs

West Semi-Final

West Final

References

Calgary Stampeders seasons
Calgary Stampeders Season, 1993